Mono Lake is a saline soda lake in Mono County, California, formed at least 760,000 years ago as a terminal lake in an endorheic basin. The lack of an outlet causes high levels of salts to accumulate in the lake which make its water alkaline.

The desert lake has an unusually productive ecosystem based on brine shrimp, which thrive in its waters, and provides critical habitat for two million annual migratory birds that feed on the shrimp and alkali flies (Ephydra hians). Historically, the native Kutzadika'a people ate the alkali flies' pupae, which live in the shallow waters around the edge of the lake. 
When the city of Los Angeles diverted water from the freshwater streams flowing into the lake, it lowered the lake level, which imperiled the migratory birds. The Mono Lake Committee formed in response and won a legal battle that forced Los Angeles to partially replenish the lake level.

Geology
Mono Lake occupies part of the Mono Basin, an endorheic basin that has no outlet to the ocean. Dissolved salts in the runoff thus remain in the lake and raise the water's pH levels and salt concentration. The tributaries of Mono Lake include Lee Vining Creek, Rush Creek and Mill Creek which flows through Lundy Canyon.

The basin was formed by geological forces over the last five million years: basin and range crustal stretching and associated volcanism and faulting at the base of the Sierra Nevada. Five million years ago, the Sierra Nevada was an eroded set of rolling hills and Mono Basin and Owens Valley did not yet exist.

 

Later volcanism in the area occurred 3.8 million to 250,000 years ago. This activity was northwest of Mono Basin and included the formation of Aurora Crater, Beauty Peak, Cedar Hill (later an island in the highest stands of Mono Lake), and Mount Hicks.

Mono Lake is believed to have formed at least 760,000 years ago, dating back to the Long Valley eruption. Sediments located below the ash layer hint that Mono Lake could be a remnant of a larger and older lake that once covered a large part of Nevada and Utah, which would put it among the oldest lakes in North America. Prominent old shore lines, called strandlines by geologists, can be seen west of the Lake.

Mono Lake is in a geologically active area at the north end of the Mono–Inyo Craters volcanic chain and is close to Long Valley Caldera. Volcanic activity continues in the Mono Lake vicinity: the most recent eruption occurred 350 years ago, resulting in the formation of Paoha Island. Panum Crater (on the south shore of the lake) is an example of a combined rhyolite dome and cinder cone.

Tufa towers
Many columns of limestone rise above the surface of Mono Lake. These limestone towers consist primarily of calcium carbonate minerals such as calcite (CaCO3). This type of limestone rock is referred to as tufa, which is a term used for limestone that forms in low to moderate temperatures.

Tufa tower formation
Mono Lake is a highly alkaline lake, or soda lake. Alkalinity is a measure of how many bases are in a solution, and how well the solution can neutralize acids. Carbonate (CO32-) and bicarbonate (HCO3−) are both bases. Hence, Mono Lake has a very high content of dissolved inorganic carbon. Through supply of calcium ions (Ca2+), the water will precipitate carbonate-minerals such as calcite (CaCO3). Subsurface waters enter the bottom of Mono Lake through small springs. High concentrations of dissolved calcium ions in these subsurface waters cause huge amounts of calcite to precipitate around the spring orifices. The tufa originally formed at the bottom of the lake. It took many decades or even centuries to form the well-recognized tufa towers. When lake levels fell, the tufa towers came to rise above the water surface and stand as the majestic pillars seen today (see Lake Level History for more information).

Tufa morphology
Description of the Mono Lake tufa dates back to the 1880s, when Edward S. Dana and Israel C. Russell made the first systematic descriptions of the Mono Lake tufa. The tufa occurs as "modern" tufa towers. However, there are tufa sections from old shorelines, when the lake levels were higher. These pioneering works in tufa morphology are still referred to by researchers today and were confirmed by James R. Dunn in 1953. The tufa types can roughly be divided into three main categories based on morphology:

Lithoid tufa - massive and porous with a rock-like appearance
Dendritic tufa - branching structures that look similar to small shrubs
Thinolitic tufa - large well-formed crystals of several centimeters

These tufa types vary interchangeably both between individual tufa towers but also within individual tufa towers. There can be multiple transitions between tufa morphologies within a single tufa tower.

Through time, many hypotheses were developed regarding the formation of the large thinolite crystals (also referred to as glendonite) in thinolitic tufa. It was relatively clear that the thinolites represented a calcite pseudomorph after some unknown original crystal. However, the original crystal was only determined when the mineral ikaite was discovered in 1963. Ikaite, or hexahydrated CaCO3, is metastable and only crystallizes at near-freezing temperatures. It is also believed that calcite crystallization inhibitors such as phosphate, magnesium, and organic carbon may aid in the stabilization of ikaite. When heated, ikaite breaks down and becomes replaced by smaller crystals of calcite. In the Ikka Fjord of Greenland, ikaite was also observed to grow in columns similar to the tufa towers of Mono Lake. This has led scientists to believe that thinolitic tufa is an indicator of past climates in Mono Lake because they reflect very cold temperatures.

Tufa chemistry
Rusell (1883) studied the chemical composition of the different tufa types in Lake Lahontan, a large Pleistocene system of multiple lakes in California, Nevada, and Oregon. Not surprisingly, it was found that the tufas consisted primarily of CaO and CO2. However, they also contain minor constituents of MgO (~2 wt%), Fe/Al-oxides (.25-1.29 wt%), and PO5 (0.3 wt%).

Carbon and oxygen isotopes

Carbon and oxygen isotopic compositions of Mono Lake tufas have the potential to reveal many interesting things about how water bodies mix in Mono Lake, how the climate changed throughout time in the Mono Basin, and how biology may or may not play a role in tufa formation. Steps have been made to understand the isotopic compositions of "modern" tufa and water isotopic composition in Mono Lake.

Mono lake water DIC has a δ13C composition of 2 ‰ (relative to PDB), and a δ18O of -0.1 ‰ (relative to SMOW). Surrounding rivers feeding into Mono Lake have a δ18O of -14 to -17.5 ‰ and contains DIC with a δ13C composition of -14 ‰ . We observe that both the δ13C and δ18O compositions of Mono Lake are enriched compared to surrounding water. One explanation for the enrichment of δ18O in Mono Lake water is evaporation. The lighter isotope (16O) will preferentially be evaporated, leaving more of the heavier isotope (18O) behind.

It is also important to note that tufa forms from a mixture between lake water and subsurface waters. Because the streams surrounding Mono Lake are depleted in δ18O compared to the lake water, combining the two sources will result in a water mixture that is more depleted than lake water. The figure above shows how δ18O of a water mixture changes with the fraction of lake water component. As the fraction of lake water decreases, the δ18O decreases. The total CO2 concentration (ΣCO2) is much higher in the lake than in surrounding streams. Hence, this isotopic dilution effect is less significant for δ13C, and water mixtures should be dominantly composed of δ13C with lake water signatures. In theory, Mono Lake tufa should have a δ13C composition reflecting the Mono lake water DIC composition, and a δ18O composition reflecting a mixture between Mono Lake and surrounding riverine water. This is only if we assume that the subsurface waters have similar compositions to riverine water.

There is also a temperature-dependent fractionation between Mono Lake water and precipitating carbonates. The clumped isotope composition (Δ47, representing the amount of 13C18O16O in the carbonate) of Mono Lake tufa are 0.734-0.735 ‰. The temperature and δ18O of the corresponding water from which the tufa formed can be calculated using these Δ47-values From these values, it is calculated that Mono Lake tufa formed at a temperature of ~15 °C in water. For δ18O, the calcite-H2O fractionation is given by:

ε=18.03(1000/T)-32.42 ~ -30‰ (SMOW)

For δ13C, the calcite-DIC fractionation is roughly given by:

ε ~ 1-2 ‰ (PDB) at 25 °C

The calcite-aragonite fractionation is roughly given by:

ε ~ 2.7 ‰ (PDB) at 25 °C

However, these fractionation effects do not account for salinity-dependency.

The δ18O values of modern tufas are 28–32.5‰, which reflects a corresponding water mixture composition of -2‰ to 2‰. This range is similar to the composition of a mixture between Mono Lake and riverine waters. However, this mixture appears to be largely dominated by Mono Lake water. Mono lake tufa have δ13C values that range from 5–8 for tufa of aragonitic composition and 7-9‰ for tufa of calcitic composition. These tufas are a little enriched compared to modern lake water DIC. As stated above, calcite/aragonite-DIC fractionation can only explain an enrichment of 1-3‰ compared to lake water, i.e. a tufa composition of 3-5‰. The reason for this small δ13C enrichment of tufa is still unclear and requires follow-up studies. It could be related to changes in DIC composition of Mono Lake, riverine water, and subsurface water compositions in the immediate past, which in turn could be related to climate or biological productivity in the lake. However, it could also be related to the fact that the isotopic composition of the subsurface waters that flow into Mono Lake is not well understood. These subsurface waters may have a very different composition compared to both Mono Lake waters and riverine surface waters. In addition, secondary crystallization (e.g. formation of calcite from aragonite) or meteoric diagenetic effects could have some control on the isotopic composition as well. Lastly, scientists may have to revisit the salinity-dependency of calcite/aragonite-DIC fractionation to understand whether this 1-3‰ fractionation may actually be larger in a lake with conditions similar to Mono Lake.

Lake-level history

An important characteristic of Mono Lake is that it is a closed lake, meaning it has no outflow. Water can only escape the lake if it evaporates or is lost to groundwater. This may cause closed lakes to become very saline. The lake level of closed lakes will be strongly dependent on changes in climate. Hence, studying lake levels can reveal information about climate change in the past and present. Geochemists have observed that carbonates from closed lakes appear to have δ13C and δ18O (carbon and oxygen isotopes) with covariant trends. It has been proposed that this covariation occurs because of coupled evaporation and CO2 degassing. The lighter isotopes, 12C and 16O, will preferentially go to the gas phase with increased evaporation. As a result, δ13C and δ18O in the remaining lake both become increasingly heavy. Other factors such as biology, atmospheric properties, and freshwater compositions and flow may also influence δ13C and δ18O in lakes. These factors must be stable to achieve a covariant δ13C and δ18O trend. As such, correlations between δ18O and δ13C can be used to infer developments in the lake stability and hydrological characteristics through time. It is important to note that this correlation is not directly related to the lake level itself but rather the rate of change in lake level. Three different studies with three different methods provide different resolutions to understanding the lake level history of Mono Lake (read below).

150-year record
The covariation between δ18O in lake water and lake level in Mono Lake have been recorded over a 150-year time interval in Mono Lake. The δ18O record was compared to historic lake levels recorded by the USGS. The lake level and δ18O record were observed to have a strong correlation with minor offsets. Changes in δ18O of lake water were inversely correlated with lake level. This revealed six stages in lake level in the past 150 years: high stands at 1845, 1880, and 1915 as well as low stands at 1860, 1900, and 1933. The δ18O record compared well to the recorded precipitation and streamflow of Nevada City in California. Decreases in δ18O correlated well with increases in precipitation as well as increases in streamflow and vice versa.

10,000-year record
A sediment core from Mono Lake reveals a 10,000 year record of carbonates (dated through ash beds). Here δ18O and δ13C did covary when observed through long time intervals of>5,000 years, whereas the correlation was not present during shorter time scales. It was found that the record revealed 5 periods of distinct lake conditions:

9.7 - 8.7 ka: Rising lake level. Decreasing δ18O and δ13C reflected an increased lake level. In fact, the lake level reached the Holocene High Stand. This high stand corresponded to a period of maximum effective moisture in the Great Basin.

8.7 - 6.5 ka: Dropping lake level. A sudden increase in δ18O and δ13C suggested that lake levels dropped. Following, weak correlation between δ18O and δ13C suggested that lake levels stabilized.

6.5 - 5.9 ka: Rising lake level. An increase in δ18O and δ13C correlated with a decrease in lake level. The lake level drop continued until the Holocene Low Stand at 5.9 ka, which corresponded to a period of minimum effective moisture in the Great Basin.

2 - 0.6 ka: Unconformity. The gap between 6 - 2 ka could be attributed to shallow lake conditions. In addition, sediment types observed in the core between 2 - 0.6 ka largely reflected shallow water conditions. During the Medieval Warm Period, which occurred from 0.9 - 0.7 ka, the lake level was around the same as today. In general, the period was dominated by a shallow, stable lake level with low covariance between δ18O and δ13C.

490 – 360 years ago: High, fluctuating lake levels. This period corresponded to the Little Ice Age. The isotopic record had very high annual resolution. The lake levels were generally high but fluctuated a little resulting in low correlation between δ18O and δ13C . At the end of this period, δ18O and δ13C evolved towards a trend of decreasing lake level.

Overall the lake levels of Mono Lake appeared to have corresponded to known climatic events such as periods of maximum or minimum effective moisture, the Medieval Warm Period, and the Little Ice Age.

35,000-year record
Lake levels of Mono Lake during the Pleistocene have also been reconstructed using stratigraphic inspection of paleoshorelines, radio carbon dating, and δ18O records from sediments. These analyses helped reconstruct lake levels of the past 35,000 years.

36 - 35 ka: Rising lake level. Decreasing δ18O revealed that lake level began to rise at about this time from a lake level altitude of 2015 m.

35 - 21 ka: High stable lake level. Little fluctuation in δ18O suggested a stable lake level. This stable lake level corresponded to two beds of silt that would have been deposited in a deep lake.

20 - 15 ka: Dropping lake level. There was a sudden fall in lake level at the beginning of this period. Sand delta terraces from this time period indicated a lake-surface altitude of 2035 m. Recorded δ18O increased over this time period, reflecting falling lake level.

5 - 13 ka: Rising lake level. During this period, Mono Lake rose to its highest lake-surface altitude of 2155 m. This corresponded to a decrease in δ18O.

13+ ka: Dropping lake level. Following peak lake level, the lake level decreased to 1965 m at ~ 10 ka as evidenced by an increase in δ18O and paleoshorelines.

This lake-level record has been correlated with significant climatic events including polar jet stream movement, Heinrich, and Dansgaard-Oeschger events.

Climate

Paleoclimate reconstruction

The reconstruction of historical Mono Lake levels through carbon and oxygen isotopes have also revealed an interesting correlation with well-documented changes in climate. In the recent past, Earth experienced periods of increased glaciation known as ice ages. This geological period of ice ages is known as the Pleistocene, which lasted until ~11 ka. Lake levels in Mono Lake can reveal how the climate fluctuated. For example, during the cold climate of the Pleistocene the lake level was higher because there was less evaporation and more precipitation. Following the Pleistocene, the lake level was generally lower due to increased evaporation and decreased precipitation associated with a warmer climate. Mono Lake reveals the climate variation on 3 different time scales: Dansgaard-Oeschger (repeats every 1,000 years), Heinrich (varying repetition), and Milankovich (repeats every 10,000 years).

Dansgaard-Oeschger
From the compilation of δ18O data over the past 51,000 years from lakes throughout the Great Basin, including Pyramid Lake, Summer Lake, Owens Lake, and Mono Lake, it has been observed that changes in lake level can be correlated to Dansgaard-Oeschger events. The δ18O records from these lakes showed oscillations in δ18O compositions of carbonates from these four lakes. Oscillation between high δ18O and low δ18O reflected cold/dry (low lake level with low precipitation) and warm/wet (high lake level with high precipitation) respectively. Read more about these isotopic effects in the Lake Level History section. Furthermore, total organic carbon (TOC) of the sediments from Pyramid Lake and Owens Lake were inversely correlated with δ18O and showed the same oscillations. TOC is often an indicator of the degree of biological productivity in a lake. This would suggest that high productivity correlated with a warm/wet climate at Mono Lake, while low productivity correlated with a cold/dry climate at Mono Lake. The timing of these oscillations matched the timing of Dansgaard-Oeschger events of the GISP2 core from 46 - 27 ka. Minima in δ18O and maxima in TOC correlated with 11 different Dansgaard-Oeschger events. Dansgaard-Oeschger events are fluctuations in δ18O records from ice cores that repeat every 1,000 years. They are thought to be related to global climatic events. However, the exact causes for these fluctuations are still unresolved.

Heinrich events
The lake level history of 36,000 years was investigated through correlations between δ18O records, radiocarbon dating, and paleomagnetic secular variation from Mono Lake sediments as described in the Lake Level History section. Peaks in the δ18O records of Mono Lake sediments correlated with 3 Heinrich events known from the sea cores of the North Atlantic. Heinrich events occurred when massive numbers of icebergs broke off from the ice sheets and fell into the North Atlantic. These Heinrich events have been observed to correlate with peaks in δ18O compositions of carbonates globally. This pattern would generally indicate a global drop in temperature and a rising ice-volume. As water vapor moves from the equator to the poles, 18O is preferentially precipitated compared to 16O. When the water precipitates at the poles, it has a very depleted δ18O composition. Hence, ice sheets are vast reservoirs of 16O and have a very depleted δ18O composition. If the temperature dropped and 16O-containing ice-volumes grew, the remaining water bodies would experience a corresponding increase in δ18O composition. Three peaks in the δ18O records of Mono Lake may reflect 3 episodes of vast growth of the Pleistocene ice sheets that resulted in massive iceberg break-off at the ice-water interface.

Milankovich-scale events
The δ18O records from Mono Lake sediments also exhibit trends over longer timescales of ~10,000 years. From 35 to 18 ka, the δ18O composition of Mono Lake sediments were gradually decreasing. This decreasing trend was inversely correlated with an increase in δ18O of sediments from a North Atlantic sea core. This trend in δ18O suggested correlation with the southward movement of the polar jet stream from 35 to 18 ka. As the polar jet stream moved southward, it caused increased precipitation of isotopically depleted rain water. In turn, this caused Southern water bodies like Mono Lake to become isotopically depleted, while Northern oceans became isotopically enriched. This movement of the polar jet stream was presumably caused by an increase in the Northern American ice sheet. Two δ18O minima at 18 ka and 13.1 ka in Mono Lake sediments reflected two lake level high-stands of Mono Lake. These lake level high-stands presumably corresponded to two passages of the polar jet stream over Mono Lake that precipitated large amounts of rainwater with a depleted δ18O composition. Following, the polar jet stream was forced south of Mono Lake. Furthermore, the sudden reduction in Total Inorganic Carbon (TIC) during 26 - 14 ka could be attributed to the Tioga glaciation. The Tioga glaciation would have caused a high in-flux of detrital materials to Mono Lake. As a result, the TIC in Mono Lake sediments would be lowered during this time period.

Limnology

The limnology of the lake shows it contains approximately 280 million tons of dissolved salts, with the salinity varying depending upon the amount of water in the lake at any given time. Before 1941, average salinity was approximately 50 grams per liter (g/L) (compared to a value of 31.5 g/L for the world's oceans).

An unintended consequence of ending the water diversions was the onset of a period of "meromixis" in Mono Lake. In the time prior to this, Mono Lake was typically "monomictic"; which means that at least once each year the deeper waters and the shallower waters of the lake mixed thoroughly, thus bringing oxygen and other nutrients to the deep waters. In meromictic lakes, the deeper waters do not undergo this mixing; the deeper layers are more saline than the water near the surface, and are typically nearly devoid of oxygen. As a result, becoming meromictic greatly changes a lake's ecology.

Mono Lake has experienced meromictic periods in the past; this most recent episode of meromixis, brought on by the end of the water diversions, commenced in 1994 and had ended by 2004.

Ecology

Aquatic life

The hypersalinity and high alkalinity (pH=10 or equivalent to 4 milligrams of NaOH per liter of water) of the lake means that no fish are native to the lake. An attempt by the California Department of Fish and Game to stock the lake failed.

The whole food chain of the lake is based on the high population of single-celled planktonic algae present in the photic zone of the lake. These algae reproduce rapidly during winter and early spring after winter runoff brings nutrients to the surface layer of water. By March the lake is "as green as pea soup" with photosynthesizing algae.

The lake is famous for the Mono Lake brine shrimp, Artemia monica, a tiny species of brine shrimp, no bigger than a thumbnail, that are endemic to the lake. During the warmer summer months, an estimated 4–6 trillion brine shrimp inhabit the lake. Brine shrimp have no food value for humans, but are a staple for birds of the region. The brine shrimp feed on microscopic algae.

Alkali flies, Ephydra hians, live along the shores of the lake and walk underwater, encased in small air bubbles for grazing and to lay eggs. These flies are an important source of food for migratory and nesting birds.

8 Nematode species were found living in the littoral sediment:

 Auanema spec., which is outstanding for its extreme arsenic resistance (survives concentrations 500 times higher than humans), having 3 sexes, and being viviparous.
 Pellioditis spec.
 Mononchoides americanus
 Diplogaster rivalis
 species of the family Mermithidae
 Prismatolaimus dolichurus
 2 species of the order Monhysterida

Birds

Mono Lake is a vital resting and eating stop for migratory shorebirds and has been recognized as a site of international importance by the Western Hemisphere Shorebird Reserve Network.
Nearly 2,000,000 waterbirds, including 35 species of shorebirds, use Mono Lake to rest and eat for at least part of the year. Some shorebirds that depend on the resources of Mono Lake include American avocets, killdeer and sandpipers. Over 1.5 million eared grebes and phalaropes use Mono Lake during their long migrations.

Late every summer tens of thousands of Wilson's phalaropes and red-necked phalaropes arrive from their nesting grounds, and feed until they continue their migration to South America or the tropical oceans respectively.

In addition to migratory birds, a few species spend several months to nest at Mono Lake. Mono Lake has the second largest nesting population of California gulls, Larus californicus, second only to the Great Salt Lake in Utah. Since abandoning the landbridged Negit Island in the late 1970s, California gulls have moved to some nearby islets and have established new, if less protected, nesting sites. Cornell University and Point Blue Conservation Science have continued the study of nesting populations on Mono Lake that was begun 35 years ago. Snowy plovers also arrive at Mono Lake each spring to nest along the remote eastern shores.

History

Native Americans

The indigenous people of Mono Lake are from a band of the Northern Paiute, called the Kutzadika'a.  They speak the Northern Paiute language. The Kutzadika'a traditionally forage alkali fly pupae, called kutsavi in their language. Mono Lake was also referred to as Teniega Bah.

The term "Mono" is derived from "Monachi", a Yokuts term for the tribes that live on both the east and west side of the Sierra Nevada.

During early contact, the first known Mono Lake Paiute chief was Captain John. He was also referred to by the Paiute names of Shibana or Poko Tucket. Captain John was the son of a Northern Paiute named 'older Captain John.'

The Mono tribe has two bands: Eastern and Western. The Eastern Mono joined the Western Mono bands' villages annually at Hetch Hetchy Valley, Yosemite Valley, and along the Merced River to gather acorns, different plant species, and to trade. The Western Mono  and Eastern mono traditionally lived in the south-central Sierra Nevada foothills, including Historical Yosemite Valley.

Present day Mono Reservations are currently located in Big Pine, Bishop, and several in Madera County and Fresno County, California.

Conservation efforts

The city of Los Angeles diverted water from the Owens River into the Los Angeles Aqueduct in 1913. In 1941, the Los Angeles Department of Water and Power extended the Los Angeles Aqueduct system farther northward into the Mono Basin with the completion of the Mono Craters Tunnel between the Grant Lake Reservoir on Rush Creek and the Upper Owens River. So much water was diverted that evaporation soon exceeded inflow and the surface level of Mono Lake fell rapidly. By 1990, the lake had dropped 45 vertical feet and had lost half its volume relative to the 1941 pre-diversion water level. As a result, alkaline sands and formerly submerged tufa towers became exposed, the water salinity doubled, and Negit Island became a peninsula, exposing the nests of California gulls to predators (such as coyotes), and forcing the gull colony to abandon this site.

In 1974 ecologist David Gaines and his student David Winkler studied the Mono Lake ecosystem and became instrumental in alerting the public of the effects of the lower water level with Winkler's 1976 ecological inventory of the Mono Basin. The National Science Foundation funded the first comprehensive ecological study of Mono Lake, conducted by Gaines and undergraduate students. In June 1977, the Davis Institute of Ecology of the University of California published a report, "An Ecological Study of Mono Lake, California," which alerted California to the ecological dangers posed by the redirection of water away from the lake for municipal uses.

Gaines formed the Mono Lake Committee in 1978. He and Sally Judy, a UC Davis student, led the committee and pursued an informational tour of California. They joined with the Audubon Society to fight a now famous court battle, the National Audubon Society v. Superior Court, to protect Mono Lake through state public trust laws. While these efforts have resulted in positive change, the surface level is still below historical levels, and exposed shorelines are a source of significant alkaline dust during periods of high winds.

Owens Lake, the once-navigable terminus of the Owens River which had sustained a healthy ecosystem, is now a dry lake bed during dry years due to water diversion beginning in the 1920s. Mono Lake was spared this fate when the California State Water Resources Control Board (after over a decade of litigation) issued an order (SWRCB Decision 1631) to protect Mono Lake and its tributary streams on September 28, 1994. SWRCB Board Vice-chair Marc Del Piero was the sole Hearing Officer (see D-1631). Since that time, the lake level has steadily risen.

In popular culture

Artwork
 In 1968, the artist Robert Smithson made Mono Lake Non-Site (Cinders near Black Point) using pumice collected while visiting Mono on July 27, 1968, with his wife Nancy Holt and Michael Heizer (both prominent visual artists). In 2004, Nancy Holt made a short film entitled Mono Lake using Super 8 footage and photographs of this trip. An audio recording by Smithson and Heizer, two songs by Waylon Jennings, and Michel Legrand's Le Jeu, the main theme of Jacques Demy's film Bay of Angels (1963), were used for the soundtrack.
 The Diver, a photo taken by Aubrey Powell of Hipgnosis for Pink Floyd's album Wish You Were Here (1975), features what appears to be a man diving into a lake, creating no ripples. The photo was taken at Mono Lake, and the tufa towers are a prominent part of the landscape. The effect was actually created when the diver performed a handstand underwater until the ripples dissipated.

In print
Mark Twain's Roughing It, published in 1872, provides an informative early description of Mono Lake in its natural condition in the 1860s. Twain found the lake to be a "lifeless, treeless, hideous desert... the loneliest place on earth."

In film
A scene featuring a volcano in the film Fair Wind to Java (1953) was shot at Mono Lake.

Most of the movie,  High Plains Drifter (1973), by Clint Eastwood, was shot on the southern shores of Mono Lake in the 1970s.  An entire town was built here for the movie, and later removed when shooting was complete.

In music
The music video for glam metal band Cinderella's 1988 power ballad Don't Know What You Got ('Till It's Gone) was filmed by the lake.

See also

 Bodie, a nearby ghost town
 List of lakes in California
 Mono Lake Tufa State Reserve
 Mono Basin National Scenic Area
 GFAJ-1, an organism from Mono Lake that has been at the center of a scientific controversy over hypothetical arsenic in DNA.
 List of drying lakes
 Whoa Nellie Deli, located in Lee Vining, California, overlooking Mono Lake
 Monolake, a Berlin-based electronic music project named after the lake

Notes

References
 Jayko, A.S., et al. (2013). Methods and Spatial Extent of Geophysical Investigations, Mono Lake, California, 2009 to 2011. Reston, Va.: U.S. Department of the Interior, U.S. Geological Survey.

External links

Mono Lake Area Visitor Information
Mono Lake Tufa State Nature Reserve
Mono Lake Committee website
Mono Lake Visitor Guide

Landsat image of Mono Lake
Roadside Geology and Mining History of the Owens Valley and Mono Basin

Saline lakes of the United States
Shrunken lakes
Lakes of Mono County, California
California placenames of Native American origin
Inyo National Forest
Mono tribe
Native American history of California
Lakes of the Sierra Nevada (United States)
Lakes of the Great Basin
Environment of California
Tourist attractions in Mono County, California
Endorheic lakes of California
Environmental controversies
Lakes of California
Lakes of Northern California
Geological type localities
Eutrophication